DeLuca, also spelled Deluca or De Luca, is an Italian-language surname.

People with the surname include:

People 
 Adrian Deluca (born 1982), former Australian rules footballer
 Alby De Luca (1908–1978), Australian rules footballer
 Anthony DeLuca (disambiguation), various people
 Antonio De Luca (bishop) (born 1956), Italian Catholic bishop
Ben DeLuca (born 1998), American football player
 Dan DeLuca (born 1970), American actor
 Eduardo Deluca, Argentinian football administrator
 Fabian Deluca (born 1987), Australian rules footballer
 Frank Deluca (1898–1967), Italian-American mobster and brother of Joseph DeLuca
 Fred DeLuca (1947–2015), American businessman and co-founder of the Subway franchise of sandwich restaurants
 George DeLuca (1889–1983), American lawyer, banker and politician
 Giorgio DeLuca, businessman and a founder of the gourmet grocery store Dean & DeLuca
 Giuseppe De Luca (1876–1950), Italian baritone
 Hector DeLuca, American biochemist and professor
 Jacqueline Frank DeLuca (born 1980), American water polo goalkeeper
 Joe DeLuca (1932–2013), Canadian football player
 John DeLuca (born 1986), American actor
 Joseph Deluca (1893–1952), Italian-American mobster
 Josh Deluca (born 1996), Australian rules footballer
 Louis DeLuca (born 1933), American retired businessman and politician, former Connecticut state senator
 Maura DeLuca, American activist and political candidate
 Michael De Luca (born 1965), American film producer and screenwriter
 Nick De Luca (born 1984), Scottish rugby union player
 Nick DeLuca (born 1995), American footballer
 Rob De Luca, American rock bass guitarist
 Rocco DeLuca (born 1975), leader and guitarist of the now-disbanded indie rock band Rocco DeLuca and the Burden
 Ryan DeLuca, founder of Bodybuilding.com
 Sam DeLuca (1936–2011), American Football League lineman
 Stefanie DeLuca, sociologist
 Vincenzo De Luca (born 1949), Italian politician and president of Campania

Characters 
 Andrew DeLuca, character from the medical drama television series Grey's Anatomy
 Detective Achille De Luca from Inspector De Luca (TV series), an Italian TV police drama
Maria DeLuca, fictional character in the Roswell High book series and the TV series Roswell

See also

 Inspector De Luca (disambiguation)
 Dean & DeLuca, upscale grocery store
 Luca (disambiguation)
 De Lucas (surname)

Italian-language surnames
Surnames of Italian origin